The Movement for the Independence of Sicily (Movimento per l'Indipendenza della Sicilia, MIS) was a separatist cultural movement with the goal of obtaining the independence of Sicily from Italy. It had its roots in the Movement for the Independence of Sicily, which was founded by Andrea Finocchiaro Aprile in 1943.

MIS survived for a long time as a pressure group under the direction of Francesco Mazza Fasanaro.

Gallery

See also
Sicilian nationalism

References

External links
M.I.S. Official Site

Separatism in Italy
Secessionist organizations in Europe
2004 establishments in Italy